The California University of Science and Medicine (CUSM) School of Medicine is a newly accredited medical school located in Colton, California/San Bernardino, San Bernardino County, United States. CUSM received preliminary LCME accreditation in February 2018, and enrolled students for classes conferring an M.D. degree beginning July 2018. The new CUSM campus, completed in 2020, has two lecture halls, nine college rooms, 15 clinical skills rooms and three labs. More than 2,400 students applied to CUSM's inaugural class, with 64 students enrolling in the class of 2022. In 2019, more than 5,300 students applied to CUSM, with 98 students enrolling in the class of 2023. In 2020, more than 5,300 students applied to CUSM, with 130 students enrolling in the class of 2024. The average GPA of accepted students is 3.6, with an average MCAT score of 513.

The California University of Science and Medicine currently is affiliated with Arrowhead Regional Medical Center as the primary teaching hospital.  The majority of the students in the class of 2022 (80%), class of 2023 (80%), and class of 2024 (98%) comes from California.

References 

Medical schools in California
Educational institutions established in 2018
Private universities and colleges in California
2018 establishments in California